Sawali Vihir Budruk is a village in Rahata taluka of Ahmednagar district in state of Maharashtra of India.

Demographics
Population of Sawali Vihir Bk. is 7115 of which males are 3575 and females are 3540.

Economy
Majority of the population is involved in farming. Business is also setting up due to proximity to Shirdi city.

Transport

Road
Two state highways pass through village which connects Shirdi, Nashik, Mumbai, Ahmednagar and Pune.

Rail
Shirdi railway station is the nearest railway station to village.

See also
List of villages in Rahata taluka

References 

Villages in Ahmednagar district